Hearts on Parade is the third studio album by American rock band American Hi-Fi. It was released on April 12, 2005, through Maverick Records. The album peaked at #129 on the US Billboard 200. Hearts on Parade received a nomination for "Album of the Year" at the Boston Music Awards in 2005.

This was the band's only album to feature Jason Sutter on drums before the 2007 return of original drummer Brian Nolan.

Production
Sessions for Hearts on Parade were held at Black in Back Studios, with Butch Walker and the band co-producing the album. Paul David Hager handled recording; he mixed almost every track at  Skip Saylor Recording, with assistant engineer Ian Blanch. "Hell Yeah!" and "Separation Anxiety" were mixed at Conway Recording Studios with assistant engineer Kevin Szymanski. George Marino mastered the album at Sterling Sound in New York City.

Release
Hearts on Parade was released on April 12, 2005. Then went on a US tour, dubbed the Coast to Coast Roast, in June and July 2005 with Reel Big Fish, Punchline and Zolof the Rock & Roll Destroyer. American Hi-Fi dropped off the tour on the around the end of June, as Reel Big Fish frontman Aaron Barrett explains: "they weren't being received very well by the ska kids, and because they were pretty burnt out from being on tour for a year and a half non-stop".

Reception

The album earned a positive review from critic Ken Capobianco of The Boston Globe. He called it a "fizzy adventure", and he also stated that "almost every track is a Top 40 hit waiting to happen".

Track listing
All lyrics by Stacy Jones, all music by American Hi-Fi.

Personnel
Personnel per booklet.

American Hi-Fi
 Stacy Jones – guitar, lead vocals
 Jamie Arentzen – guitar
 Drew Parsons – bass guitar
 Jason Sutter – drums

Production
 Butch Walker – producer
 American Hi-Fi – producer
 Paul David Hager – recording, mixing
 Ian Blanch – assistant engineer
 Kevin Szymanski – assistant engineer
 George Marino – mastering
 Lyle Owerko – creative direction
 Miki Araki – art direction, design
 Pete White – logo design
 The Flem – cover design
 Mark Owerko – photography
 Jade Loop – cover photo

References

2005 albums
American Hi-Fi albums
Maverick Records albums
Albums produced by Butch Walker